Ilmari Frans Ruikka (16 January 1925 – 31 July 2013) was a freestyle wrestler from Finland. In 1951 he won the national title and a silver medal at the world championships in the 62 kg division. Ruikka was a tram driver by profession. He was married and had one child, born in 1952. Besides wrestling he did cross-country skiing.

References

1925 births
2013 deaths
People from Tornio
Finnish male sport wrestlers
World Wrestling Championships medalists
Sportspeople from Lapland (Finland)
20th-century Finnish people
21st-century Finnish people